Dizzy Polizzy is a compilation album by Purling Hiss, released independently in 2011.

Track listing

Personnel
Adapted from the Dizzy Polizzy liner notes.
 Mike Polizze – vocals, instruments

Release history

References

External links 
 

2011 compilation albums
Purling Hiss albums
Drag City (record label) compilation albums